Cocteaufest is an event organized and held annually by fans of the Cocteau Twins from around the world who gather for a night of music, dancing, prizes, and socializing with other fans.

The event is a celebration of the artists, their music and their legacy. Throughout the event, fans sell unique merchandise, hold auctions, show other forms of memorabilia and rare items and give away free prizes. DJs and other bands may attend and perform their own renditions of their favorite Cocteau Twins songs.

Cocteaufest began in 2003 in Boston, MA and has since been organized and celebrated around the world.

Years and locations 
2003 – Boston  USA - 
2004 – Los Angeles USA
2005 – Toronto Canada
2006 – Manchester England
2007 – New York City  USA (private party) - 
2008 – London England
2009 – Muskoka Canada
2010 – London England
2011 - New York City USA
2012 – São Paulo Brazil - 
2013 – Paris France  - 
2014  - San Francisco  - USA - 
2015 - Santiago - Chile
2017 - Berlin - Germany
2018  - San Francisco - US
2019  - San Francisco - US
2020  - virtual online party - São Paulo Brazil, London England & San Francisco USA

References 

Music festivals established in 2003
Rock festivals in the United States
Rock festivals in France
Fan conventions